Esmail Gavabar (also Romanized as Esmā‘īl Gavābar and Esma‘īl Gavābar; also known as Esmā‘īl Gavābar-e ‘Olyā) is a village in Shabkhus Lat Rural District, Rankuh District, Amlash County, Gilan Province, Iran. At the 2006 census, its population was 752, in 214 families.

References 

Populated places in Amlash County